is a children's song and the 21st single by Japanese singer/songwriter Chisato Moritaka. Written by Moritaka and Hiromasa Ijichi, the single was released by One Up Music on January 25, 1994. The song was used as the first opening theme of the Fuji TV children's show  and was featured in the 1995 various artists album Ponkickies Melody. The cover art was illustrated by Lily Franky.

Chart performance 
"Rock'n Omelette" peaked at No. 13 on Oricon's singles chart and sold 100,000 copies.

Other versions 
Moritaka re-recorded the song and uploaded the video on her YouTube channel on December 14, 2012. This version is also included in Moritaka's 2013 self-covers DVD album Love Vol. 3.

Track listing

Personnel 
 Chisato Moritaka – vocals, drums
 Yuichi Takahashi – guitar, bass, backing vocals
 Shin Kōno – piano

Chart positions

Cover versions 
 Satoko Yamano covered the song on her 1994 single "Kodomo no Uta ~ Rock'n Omelette".
 Kuko covered the song on her 1994 album Min'na de Utaou! Kodomo no Uta Rock'n Omelette.
 Sayuri Hara, Ruriko Aoki, and Atsumi Tanezaki covered the song on the 2018 album Cinderella Party Dere pa Ondo Dondonka.

References

External links 
 
 
 

1994 singles
1994 songs
Japanese-language songs
Japanese children's songs
Chisato Moritaka songs
Songs with lyrics by Chisato Moritaka
Songs with music by Hiromasa Ijichi
One Up Music singles